The Grand Lodge of Ancient, Free and Accepted Masons of Nebraska is one of two governing bodies of Freemasonry in the U.S. state of Nebraska (along with the Prince Hall Mason Grand Lodge of Nebraska). It was established on September 23, 1857. The Grand Lodge of Nebraska is headquartered at Lincoln, Nebraska.

History
The Grand Lodge Of Nebraska was formed in 1857, when the Masters and Wardens of three lodges organized a Grand Lodge for the then newly established Nebraska Territory.  Those subordinate lodges were: Nebraska Lodge No. 184 (chartered from the Grand Lodge of Illinois), Giddings Lodge No. 156 (chartered from the Grand Lodge of Missouri) and Capitol Lodge No. 101 (chartered from the Grand Lodge Of Iowa). With the formation of the Grand Lodge, these three lodges went on to become: "Nebraska Lodge No. 1," "Western Star Lodge No. 2," and "Capitol Lodge No. 3," respectively.

Prince Hall Mason Grand Lodge of Nebraska

The first Prince Hall Masonic Lodges first formed in Nebraska in the 1890s. On February 3, 1990, during the 133rd Annual Communication of the Grand Lodge, a resolution was passed extending fraternal recognition to the Prince Hall Grand Lodge, F.&A.M. of Nebraska. That same year, the Prince Hall Grand Lodge reciprocated that recognition. During next year's Annual Communication, it was reported that members of both Grand Lodges participated in each other's degree work, and even participated in a Table Lodge together. Today, Prince Hall Masons meet at the former Druid Hall of the Woodmen of the World in the Saratoga neighborhood of North Omaha.

Notable Freemasons from Nebraska
For a list of notable Freemasons from other jurisdictions, see the List of Freemasons.
Robert C. Jordan: Capitol Lodge No. 3 - First Grand Master of Nebraska.
 George W. Lininger: Capitol Lodge No. 3, former Grand Master of Nebraska.
 William Jennings Bryan: Lincoln Lodge No. 19.
 William F. "Buffalo Bill" Cody: Platte Valley Lodge No. 32.
 Peter Kiewit: George W. Lininger Lodge No. 268.
 John J. Pershing, 33°: Lincoln Lodge No. 19.
 Nathan Roscoe Pound: Lancaster Lodge No. 54.

See also
 History of Omaha

References

Further reading

External links
 Official Grand Lodge of Nebraska website
 Nebraska Lodge No. 1
Long Pine Lodge No. 136

Organizations based in Nebraska
Nebraska
Freemasonry in the United States
1857 establishments in Nebraska Territory
Organizations established in 1857